Célia Domain (born  29 April 2000) is a French rugby union player. She plays for the France women's national rugby union team and Blagnac Rugby.

Domain was selected for the French senior team for the first time in 2018. She was named in France's team for the delayed 2021 Rugby World Cup in New Zealand.

References

2000 births
Living people
French female rugby union players